Jørgen Paulov Hammer (born 2 April 1991) is a Norwegian association football player who currently plays for KFUM Oslo.

Career
He spent his youth career in Hosle IL and Bærum SK before joining Stabæk Fotball at junior level. He signed a professional contract in August 2010, lasting throughout the year. Already two days later he made his first-team debut, at home against Lillestrøm SK.

In August 2015, Hammer moved from Stabæk to IK Start.

Career statistics

Club

References

JØRGEN HAMMER KLAR FOR OBOS-KLUBB, sporten.com, 6 January 2016

External links

1991 births
Living people
Sportspeople from Bærum
Norwegian footballers
Bærum SK players
Stabæk Fotball players
IK Start players
KFUM-Kameratene Oslo players
Eliteserien players
Norwegian First Division players
Association football defenders